The Girl Who Came Back could refer to: 

The Girl Who Came Back (1918 film), American silent drama film directed by Robert G. Vignola 
The Girl Who Came Back (1923 film), American silent drama film directed by Tom Forman 
The Girl Who Came Back (1935 film), American crime film directed by Charles Lamont